On 3 August 1979, a Constitutional Convention election was held in Kerman Province constituency with plurality-at-large voting format in order to decide two seats for the Assembly for the Final Review of the Constitution.

Only five candidates ran for the two seats, which both went to those endorsed by the Coalition of Islamic Parties in absence of many rival groups. The candidate supported by the Freedom Movement of Iran was placed fifth with less than 1% of the votes cast.

Results 

 
 
|-
|colspan="14" style="background:#E9E9E9;"|
|-
 
 
 

|-
|colspan=14|
|-
|colspan=14|Source:

References

1979 elections in Iran
Kerman Province